Deiandra arida (formerly Hemizonia arida), also called Red Rock tarplant, is a rare California annual plant in the family Asteraceae.

Habitat and range
Deiandra arida occurs on clay and volcanic soils and in desert dry wash from 1,000-3,000 feet (300–900 m) in elevation. It is known from only 10 sites in the Red Rock Canyon State Park area of the Mojave Desert in Kern County, California.

Growth pattern
It is a branched annual growing from 1' to 3' (30–90 cm) tall.

Leaves and stems
Lower leaves are inversely lanceolate and hairless, with toothed margins. Upper leaves are without teeth (entire) at the outside edge, and are covered in sparse, short, stiff hairs, giving it a bristly feel.

Flowers and fruits
Flower heads grow in flat-topped clusters at the tops of stems. Flower heads have 18-25 yellow disk flowers, with 5-10 yellow ray flowers. Bristly phyllaries halfway enclose the akenes.

References

External links
Calflora Database: Deinandra arida (Red rock tarplant)
  Jepson eFlora (TJM2) treatment of Deinandra arida
Missouri Botanical Garden Herbarium specimen photo, isotype of Hemizonia arida/Deinandra arida

arida
Endemic flora of California
Flora of the California desert regions
Natural history of the Mojave Desert
Natural history of Kern County, California
Plants described in 1958
Critically endangered flora of California